Robinson Ekspeditionen 2018 was the twentieth season of the Danish version of Swedish television series Expedition Robinson. The season premiered on August 27, 2018. This season began with three tribes as opposed to two. This year the tribes were separated into groups by Heltene (Heroes), Skurkene (Villains) and Jokerne (Jokers). In the premiere episode tribes were introduced by Robinson winners Dan "The Man" Marstrand and Sonny Rønne Petersen, as well as veteran Richard Asklund. As punishment for losing the first challenge the Jokerne tribe was forced to live in a swamp. A returning feature this season is the duel. Similar to last season, this year the winner of the duel has their tribe exempt from participating in the immunity challenge and therefore, safe from tribal council. The loser of the duel is sent home and has to have their tribe compete in the immunity challenge against the tribe that finished second.

Finishing order

Season Summary

 As Martin came in first at the death match duel his tribe was given immunity and did not need to compete in the first immunity challenge.

 As Søren came in first at the death match duel his tribe was given immunity and did not need to compete in the second immunity challenge.

 As Zanne came in first at the death match duel her tribe was given immunity and did not need to compete in the third immunity challenge.

 As Ulrik came in first at the death match duel he was allowed to pick first when the Jokerne tribe was absorbed.

 As Yasser lost the death match duel he was absorbed into the Heltene tribe.

 As Jamil won the death match duel the North team was immune from tribal council. As punishment for losing the death match duel Lasse received a penalty vote at the next tribal council.

 As punishment for coming in last at the immunity challenge Emilie received a penalty vote at the next tribal council.

 As Morten won the death match duel the South team was immune from tribal council. As punishment for losing the death match duel Türker received a penalty vote at the next tribal council.

 As punishment for coming in last at the immunity challenge Loco received a penalty vote at the next tribal council.

 As Türker won the death match duel the North team was immune from tribal council.

 As punishment for losing the death match duel Melis received a penalty vote at the next tribal council.

 As punishment for coming in last at the immunity challenge Türker received a penalty vote at the next tribal council.

 As there was a tie at tribal council Karina and Yasser took part in a duel to determine who would be eliminated.

 As there was a tie at tribal council Michael and Türker took part in a duel to determine who would be eliminated.

Voting history

 As Jamil won the death match duel the North team was immune from tribal council. As punishment for losing the death match duel Lasse received a penalty vote at the next tribal council.

 As punishment for coming in last at the immunity challenge Emilie received a penalty vote at the next tribal council.

 As Morten won the death match duel the South team was immune from tribal council. As punishment for losing the death match duel Türker received a penalty vote at the next tribal council.

 As punishment for coming in last at the immunity challenge Loco received a penalty vote at the next tribal council.

 As punishment for losing the death match duel Melis received a penalty vote at the next tribal council.

 As punishment for coming in last at the immunity challenge Türker received a penalty vote at the next tribal council.

 As there was a tie at tribal council Karina and Yasser took part in a duel to determine who would be eliminated.

 As there was a tie at tribal council Michael and Türker took part in a duel to determine who would be eliminated.

 As reward for winning plank at the start of the final Zanne was automatically given a spot in the final challenge and immunity from the last two elimination challenges. She was also granted the right to vote for the second finalist along with the jury.

 As he received the most jury votes to proceed to the final challenge of Loco, Jamil and Michael, Loco was granted the second spot in the final challenge and did not have to take part in the final elimination.

External links

Robinson Ekspeditionen seasons
2018 Danish television seasons
Danish reality television series